Avalanche is a steel bobsled roller coaster at Blackpool Pleasure Beach in Blackpool, England. It is the first and, as of 2022, the only bobsled roller coaster in the United Kingdom. It was designed for the park by Mack of Germany in 1988.

The ride has three trains (only two trains can be operated at any given time) consisting of seven cars each. Each car can hold two riders for a total of 14 passengers per train.

History
Avalanche was officially opened on 22 June 1988 by Eddie "The Eagle" Edwards. It was the first bobsled-type roller coaster to be constructed in the United Kingdom and the third bobsled coaster built by Mack Rides. A visit to Mack-owned Europa Park, where the company's first bobsled product had already been released in 1985, inspired the creation of Avalanche.

The Pleasure Beach sponsored the British Bobsleigh team during the 1988 Winter Olympics and supported them by donating a portion of Avalanche ticket sales to the team.

In its first year of operation, Avalanche carried one million passengers.

The ride
Avalanche starts by passing through the storage room of the trains, then out of the building and onto the lift hill, so far the ride follows a normal ride track, at the top of the lift hill, the ride is released onto the main downhill track, which the ride is not physically held onto, it travels through various bobsled track style curves, picking up speed, before reaching the lowest curve and curving back up again, it then flattens out and travels into the first brake run, it then releases and the train travels around a bend and onto the second brake run, before being released again to travel into the station. The two brake runs are designed for when the roller coaster operates in full capacity, with all three trains running, so that the two trains returning to the station can wait on the brakes while the train in the station loads and unloads.

The ride has  of track and the cars reach a maximum speed of around 50mph.

Theming
Avalanche is themed around an Alpine bobsled track, the station building was built to look like an Alpine village lodge. The loading platform room is decorated with emblems of different Swiss regions and various pictures of famous Bobsled teams, there is a predominant picture of the British Bobsleigh team of the Calgary Winter Olympics, 1988 which sits alongside a plaque commemorating the ride's opening by Eddie "The Eagle" Edwards. Traditional Swiss music plays in the station and outside the station building. 
The trains themselves are painted in the same colours as the 1988 British Bobsled team, and a bobsleigh used by the Great British team is displayed in the station building.
The various curves of the track are given names of real turns on professional Bobsleigh tracks, such as "The Wall" and "The Snake", although the turns on the ride itself are not actually based on real bobsled turns.

Incidents

 In 1994, ten people were hospitalized after the train stopped brusquely on the block section outside of the station.
 In 1997, the train jumped on the brakes, causing it to crash into itself. One boy was taken to hospital with bruised ribs. This incident was shown on the BBC TV documentary about Blackpool Pleasure Beach in 1998.

Media
Avalanche appears in the video game RollerCoaster Tycoon Deluxe in the Blackpool Pleasure Beach scenario.

References

Blackpool Pleasure Beach
Roller coasters in the United Kingdom
Roller coasters introduced in 1988